Warm Wet Circles is a song by the British neo-progressive rock band Marillion. It was the third single from their fourth studio album Clutching at Straws, released on 26 October 1987.

"Warm Wet Circles" peaked at number 22 in the UK Singles Chart, becoming the band's 9th top-thirty hit in a row, and remained on the chart for four weeks. The music video featured footage of the band's concert at Lorelei in West Germany on 18 July 1987. The B-side is a live recording of "White Russian", another track from Clutching at Straws also made during the Loreley concert. The 12" version additionally contains a version of "Incommunicado" from this concert.

In Argentina, the single was published under the Spanish title "Círculos Húmedos y Cálidos".

A CD replica of the single was also part of a collector's box-set released in July 2000 which contained Marillion's first twelve singles and was re-issued as a 3-CD set in 2009.

Track listing

7" single

Side A 
"Wet Warm Circles" (Remix)—04:30

Side B 
"White Russian" (Live)—06:14

7" Picture disc 
"Wet Warm Circles" (Remix)—04:30

Side B 
"White Russian" (Live)—06:14

12" Single/picture disc

Side A 
"Wet Warm Circles" (Remix)—04:30

Side B 
"White Russian" (Live)—06:14
"Incommunicado" (Live)—05:23

5" CD Single 
"Wet Warm Circles" (Remix)—04:30
"White Russian" (Live)—06:14
"Incommunicado" (Live)—05:23
Total Time 15:57

All tracks written by Dick/Rothery/Kelly/Trewavas/Mosley.

Personnel
Fish – vocals
Steve Rothery - guitars
Mark Kelly - keyboards
Pete Trewavas - bass
Ian Mosley - drums
Tessa Niles - backing vocals on "Warm Wet Circles"
Cori Josias - backing vocals on "White Russian" and "Incommunicado"

References 

Marillion songs
1987 singles
Song recordings produced by Chris Kimsey
1987 songs
EMI Records singles
Songs written by Fish (singer)
Songs written by Mark Kelly (keyboardist)
Songs written by Ian Mosley
Songs written by Pete Trewavas